Mel Tormé Sings Sunday in New York & Other Songs About New York is a 1963 studio album by Mel Tormé, of songs about New York City.

Track listing 
 "Sunday in New York" (Carroll Coates, Peter Nero) – 2:34	
 "Autumn in New York" (Vernon Duke) – 3:24
 "Lullaby of Birdland" (George Shearing, George David Weiss) - 2:20
 "Broadway" (Billy Bird, Teddy McRae, Henri Woode) - 2:08
 "The Brooklyn Bridge" (Sammy Cahn, Jule Styne) – 2:44
 "Let Me Off Uptown" (Earl Bostic, Redd Evans) – 2:37
 "Forty Second Street" (Al Dubin, Harry Warren) – 2:25
 "Sidewalks of New York" (Charles B. Lawlor, James W. Blake) - 2:09
 "Harlem Nocturne (Nocturne for the Blues)" (Earle Hagen, Dick Rogers) – 3:55
 "New York, New York" (Leonard Bernstein, Betty Comden, Adolph Green) – 2:23
 "There's a Broken Heart for Every Light on Broadway" (Fred Fisher, Howard Johnson) – 2:22
 "Manhattan" (Lorenz Hart, Richard Rodgers) – 3:12
 "My Time of Day" (Frank Loesser) – 1:21

Performance 
Mel Tormé - vocals
{|
|-
|Johnny Williams:
|arranged and conducted tracks # 1,4,6,8
|-
|Dick Hazard:
|arranged and conducted tracks # 2,7,9,12
|-
|Shorty Rodgers:
|arranged and conducted tracks # 3,5,10,11
|-
|Bull Putnam:
|Recording Engineer
|-
|Loring Eutenmey:
|Cover Photo
|-
|Nesuhi Ertegun:
|Supervision
|}
Mel Tormé	Drums, Primary Artist, Vocals
Violins
Harry Bluestone, Israel Baker, Marvin Limonick, Gerald Vinci, James Getzoff, Lou Raderman, Paul Shure, Henry Roth
Viola
Alvin Dinkin, Allan Harshman	
Cello
Margaret Aue, Edgar Lustgarten
Harp
Dorothy Remsen
Woodwind
Gene Cipriano, Buddy Collette, Paul Horn, Ronnie Lang, John Lowe. Arnold Koblentz  (Oboe)
Trumpet
Al Porcino, Frank Beach, Ray Triscari, Stu Williamson
Trombone
Lew McCreary, Richard Taylor, Dick Nash, Lloyd Ulyate
John Kitzmiller Tuba
Dave Barbour	Guitar
Jimmy Rowles	Piano
Joe Mondragon	Bass
Shelly Manne	Drums
Arranger, Conductor 
Johnny Williams, Dick Hazard, Shorty Rogers

References 

1963 albums
Mel Tormé albums
Atlantic Records albums
Concept albums